The New South Wales rugby league team has represented the Australian state of New South Wales in rugby league football since the sport's beginnings there in 1907. Also known as the Blues due to their sky blue jerseys, the team competes in the annual State of Origin series. This annual event is a series of three games competing for the State of Origin shield. As of 2022, the team is coached by Brad Fittler and captained by James Tedesco.

Prior to 1980 when the "state-of-origin" selection criteria were introduced, the New South Wales team, in addition to playing annually against Queensland, played matches against foreign touring sides and occasionally toured overseas themselves. They have played all their home matches at ANZ stadium in Sydney, New South Wales in the largest stadium in the state, since it was built in 1999 for the 2000 Sydney Olympics. The New South Wales team retained the 2019 Holden State of Origin Shield after beating Queensland 2-1 after being down 1–0, becoming the first NSW team to win a decider since the 2005 side, and were victorious again in the 2021 series.

History

Pre-Origin era (1907–1980)
 The New South Wales rugby league team pre-dates the Australian national team, playing their inaugural match against a rebel New Zealand rugby team on the 1907–08 New Zealand rugby tour of Australia and Great Britain under existing rugby union rules. That inaugural "All Blues" side, the first football team assembled by the newly formed NSWRFL was:

Backs: Charles Hedley · Johnno Stuntz · Ed Fry · Dally Messenger · Frank Cheadle · Albert Rosenfeld · Lou D'Alpuget
Forwards: Harry Hamill · Arthur Hennessy · Bob Mable · Peter Moir · Sid Pearce · Billy Cann · Robert Graves · Herb Brackenreg

Two further matches were played against New Zealand before their tour took them to the Northern Hemisphere, with Jim Devereaux also featuring for the Blues. The visiting All Golds won all three games. However, on the return leg of their tour, almost a year later, with the New South Wales Rugby Football League premiership established, the Blues won the first two matches they ever played under 13-a-side rules against New Zealand. Later in 1908 the Queensland team, whose first taste of rugby league football was also against the visiting Kiwis, traveled to Sydney for the first series of games between the two states. New South Wales won all three matches, setting a precedent for interstate dominance that would continue throughout most of the 20th century.

In 1910 New South Wales defeated the touring England team in two of their three games. After that they became the first Blues side to travel to Queensland for the annual interstate series.

In 1912 the New South Wales team first toured New Zealand. They also visited New Zealand in 1913. During the 1913 New Zealand rugby league tour of Australia New South Wales played four matches against the Kiwis, winning three of them.

The New South Wales team lost its first game against Queensland in 1922. In 2019 the Blues also toured New Zealand.

During the 1951 French rugby league tour of Australia and New Zealand New South Wales played one match against the successful France national rugby league team, a 14-all draw.

The New South Wales team hosted 2 matches of the 1953 American All Stars tour of Australia and New Zealand at the Sydney Cricket Ground, winning 62-41 and 27–18.

In a 1954 tour match between Great Britain and New South Wales the referee left the field in disgust at the players' persistent fighting after 56 minutes so the match was abandoned.

State of Origin era (1980 – present)
New South Wales' dominance over Queensland came to an end with the introduction of 'state of origin' selection rules in the early 1980s.

During the Super League war, in 1997 New South Wales was represented by two teams: one made up of players from clubs that remained loyal to the Australian Rugby League, which competed in the 1997 State of Origin series; another made up of players from clubs that joined the rebel Super League which competed in the one-off Super League Tri-series.

Ricky Stuart, who had previously coached New South Wales in 2005, was announced as the first full-time Blues coach in November 2010. Following the 2012 series, the Blues' seventh consecutive loss, Stuart resigned the role. Stuart took a role as the Parramatta Eels head coach in 2013, citing family reasons for his move. Although the Blues continued their losing streak during Stuart's tenure, he is credited with restoring passion and pride to the NSW jersey and closing the gap between the two states. He was replaced by former Canberra, NSW and Australia teammate Laurie Daley. Daley's appointment as NSW State of Origin coach was announced in August 2012 and effective from season 2013. Daley got job over candidates including Trent Barrett, Brad Fittler and Daniel Anderson. Daley coached the Blues to a series win in 2014, their first since 2005 and over his coaching rival and long time Canberra & Australian teammate Mal Meninga. Daley ended Meninga's and Queensland's run of eight series wins with victories in Game I and Game II of the 2014 series.  In 2015, New South Wales suffered its biggest origin loss losing 52–6 against Queensland in the decider.  In 2016, New South Wales lost the series 2–1 but managed to win the third and final dead rubber game.  In 2017, New South Wales were widely tipped to win the series as Queensland had a number of key players injured.  In Game 1, New South Wales beat Queensland in convincing fashion 28–4 and in Game 2 were leading the maroons 16–6 at halftime before Queensland won the game in the final two minutes to win 18–16.  In Game 3, New South Wales lost the series losing 22–6 in Brisbane.  In August 2017, Daley was terminated as coach of New South Wales.

In 2018, Brad Fittler was appointed as the new coach and left out established players such as Aaron Woods, Josh Jackson, Blake Ferguson and Josh Dugan.  The Blues went on to win the series 2–1. In 2019, the Blues were widely tipped to win the series owing to the retirement from representative football of Queensland Origin greats Cooper Cronk, Billy Slater and Cameron Smith. However, Queensland had an upset win 18–14 over the Blues in Game 1 forcing Fittler to make seven changes to the Blues starting line-up. Though he was roundly criticised for the move, the Blues went on to win the series 2–1, easily defeating Queensland 38–6 in Game 2 in Optus Stadium in Perth Western Australia, the greatest winning margin of a Blues squad since Game 3, 2000. Finally, in a thrilling Game 3 at ANZ Stadium in Sydney, winger Blake Ferguson and fullback James Tedesco combined to score the winning try with just 32 seconds to go in the game to secure the series, off the back of play started from recalled halfback Mitchell Pearce.

Colours and badge

The primary colour of New South Wales Blues is sky blue, which represents the state colour of New South Wales. The secondary colour is navy blue, with additional contrasting colour of white.

Shirt sponsors and manufacturers

* HFC Finance sponsored the NSW Origin team for the one-off exhibition game in Los Angeles in 1987

Supporters
The official New South Wales rugby league team supporter group is known as "Blatchy's Blues".

Players

Current squad

Team of the Century (1908–2007)
Before Game I of the 2008 State of Origin series, to celebrate the game's centenary that year, New South Wales named their team of the century:

Hall of Fame
Ahead of the 2017 State of Origin series, NSW named the inaugural inductees to the NSWRL Hall of Fame, joining automatic inductees Dally Messenger and the seven Immortals who represented NSW.

Origin Greats
As part of the 25-year celebrations in 2005, New South Wales named 25 legends for each year before that.

Captains

Coaches
New South Wales have had a total of thirteen different coaches at State of Origin level, eight of which have previously played for the Blues. The list also includes the known coaches from the pre-Origin era and only counts games against Queensland. Games against touring teams from New Zealand, Great Britain and France are not included. Ted Glossop, Frank Stanton and Terry Fearnley are the only coaches to have coached NSW in both State of Residence and State of Origin formats.

NSWRL Hall of Fame inductee Brad Fittler is the incumbent coach for the NSW Blues. In his first match in charge, he chose 11 players to debut.

Selectors
As of 2018 the current New South Wales State of Origin side's selection panel consists of Danny Buderus, Andrew Johns and Greg Alexander.

Records

New South Wales Residents rugby league team

New South Wales Women's rugby league team

See also

References

External links

 
Rugby League State of Origin
Rugby league representative teams in New South Wales
1907 establishments in Australia